Grizzard is a surname. Notable people with the surname include:

 Ephraim Grizzard (died 1892), African-American lynching victim
 Frank E. Grizzard, Jr. (born 1954), American historian, writer, and documentary editor
 George Grizzard (1928–2007), American actor
 Herman Grizzard (died 1971), American radio disc jockey
 Lewis Grizzard (1946–1994), American writer and humorist
 Rod Grizzard (born 1980), American basketball player